Zeljković is a surname found in Croatia, Bosnia and Serbia. Notable people with the surname include:

Mladen Zeljković (born 1987), Serbian football player
Nives Zeljković (born 1981), Croatian model, singer and writer
Samir Zeljković (born 1997), Bosnian football player
Suad Zeljković (born 1960), Bosnian politician
Vico Zeljković (born 1988), Bosnian businessman and football executive
Zoran Zeljković (born 1980), Slovenian footballer and manager

See also
 Zelikovitch

Serbian surnames
Croatian surnames
Bosnian surnames